Kochek Oloom (also Romanized as Kochāk ‘Oloom and Kochek ‘Oloom) is a village in Fajr Rural District, in the Central District of Gonbad-e Qabus County, Golestan Province, Iran. At the 2016 census, its population was 1,381 , in 330 families.

References

Populated places in Gonbad-e Kavus County